Robert Keating was an Irish politician from Cashel in County Tipperary.

He was elected at the 1847 general election as a Member of Parliament (MP) for County Waterford,
as a Repeal Association candidate.
The Times newspaper of London reported that at the time of his election he was employed by the Board of Works a rate of 7s/6d per day, claiming that this proved "beyond a shadow of a doubt" that he was unqualified to be an MP.

He did not defend the seat at the 1852 general election, but stood instead as an Irish Whig Party candidate in Waterford City. He won that seat, and held it until 1857, when he did not stand again.

References

External links 
 
 

Year of birth missing
Year of death missing
Members of the Parliament of the United Kingdom for County Waterford constituencies (1801–1922)
UK MPs 1847–1852
UK MPs 1852–1857
People from Cashel, County Tipperary
Irish Repeal Association MPs
Whig (British political party) MPs for Irish constituencies